South Xixi Wetland is a metro station of Line 3 of Hangzhou Metro in China, which opened on 10 June 2022. It is located in Xihu District of Hangzhou, adjacent to the Xixi National Wetland Park. Here Line 3 splits into two directions. The mainline heading toward Hangzhou West railway station in Yuhang District while the branch stretches into Xiaoheshan Higher Education Park in Xihu District.

References 

Railway stations in Zhejiang
Hangzhou Metro stations